African-American self-determination refers to efforts to secure self-determination for African-Americans and related peoples in North America. It often intersects with the historic Back-to-Africa movement and general Black separatism, but also manifests in present and historic demands for self-determination on North American soil, ranging from autonomy to independence. The freedom to make whatever choices as a free American, and willfulness to do for self are often a key demand for advocates of African-American self-determination.

As U.S. state

Edwin P. McCabe in Oklahoma
Former Kansas State Auditor Edwin P. McCabe joined the migration of thousands of African-Americans to the Oklahoma Territory in 1890, and then promoted African-American migration to the territory. By 1892, from the city of Langston, he geared his promotion toward the goal of a black-majority state that would eventually send two African-American senators to Congress in Washington, D.C., and to guarantee a black majority in every congressional district of the new state. He helped populate at least twenty-five new black-majority towns in the territory to the goal of black-majority statehood, even as white racial sentiments soured against African-Americans in the territory enough to implement segregation in the territory's laws by the time Oklahoma Territory was merged with the Indian Territory to become the state of Oklahoma in 1907. In the end, neither a black majority nor McCabe's dreams of a governorship over a black-majority state were realized.

Oscar Brown Sr.
The National Movement for the Establishment of a 49th State was established by Chicago-based businessman Oscar Brown, Sr., who sought for the formation of a state within the union on U.S. soil which could be populated and governed by African-Americans, and which could apportion the benefits of the New Deal more equitably to African-Americans. Eventually, the organization fizzled out before the eventual 49th state, Alaska, was admitted to the Union in 1959.

Republic of New Afrika

The Republic of New Afrika was an organization which sought three key goals:
 Creation of an independent African-American-majority country situated in the southeastern United States, in the heart of black-majority population. A similar claim is made for all the black-majority counties and cities throughout the United States.
 Payment of several billion dollars in reparations to African-American descendants of slaves by the US government for the damages inflicted on Africans and their descendants by chattel enslavement, Jim Crow segregation, and modern-day forms of racism. 
 A referendum of all African Americans to determine their desires for citizenship; movement leaders say they were not offered a choice in this matter after emancipation in 1865 following the American Civil War.

Established in 1968, the RNA attracted a number of members, including Robert F. Williams, Betty Shabazz and Chokwe Lumumba. The organization persists to this day.

American Communist support

During the USSR
The idea for outright independence was also adopted by American communist activists. Throughout US history, several revolutionary organizations have sought to promote control of the region as a separate political nation within the United States. The black liberation activist Cyril Briggs wrote a number of editorials starting in 1917 which called for a "colored autonomous state" on U.S. soil, first in the publication Amsterdam News and later in the publication The Crusader which he founded in 1918. The Communist Party USA (CPUSA) later adopted the suggestion that African Americans in the "Black Belt" region constituted an oppressed nation, and that they should be allowed to vote on self-determination, as had populations following World War I under rules of the League of Nations. After fierce debate in the Sixth World Congress of the Communist International (Comintern) in 1928, the CPUSA officially adopted a plan for self-determination for an African-American nation in the region.

Although Josef Stalin was the leader of the Communist Party of the Soviet Union at the time and the architect of the Comintern's line on the national question, the Black Belt national proposal drew its roots from the thinking of Vladimir Lenin, who identified what he described as an African-American nation in the southern US. American activist Harry Haywood is generally recognized as the principal theoretician of the CPUSA's Black Belt line.

Given the CPUSA's proposal on the national question, it enjoyed large-scale party growth in the US South. But the party was also involved in organizing agricultural workers and supporting African-American civil rights, which most Black US Americans considered more important. In Alabama, for instance, the Party organized the Sharecroppers' Union (SCU) in 1931, which grew to "a membership of nearly 2,000 organized in 73 locals, 80 women's auxiliaries, and 30 youth groups." The SCU was openly organized by Alabama communists, and while it drew substantial support from the African-American community, it was subject to a harsh crackdown by state and non-state actors. Nevertheless, it helped lead a strike of agricultural workers for higher wages.
"[T]he SCU claimed some substantial victories. On most of the plantations affected, the union won at least seventy-five cents per one hundred pounds, and in areas not affected by the strike, landlords reportedly increased wages from thirty-five cents per hundred pounds to fifty cents or more in order to avert the spread of the strike." During the same period, the CPUSA also alienated much of the African-American working class by excoriating other self-determination organizations such as the Movement for a 49th State and the back-to-Africa-oriented Peace Movement of Ethiopia for not toeing the party line on self-determination.

In 1935, the CPUSA abandoned its line on national self-determination for the Black Belt. It wanted to attract coalition support from middle-class African-American groups in the Northeast as a part of the Party's "Hands Off Ethiopia" campaign. It launched this effort after Italian forces under Mussolini invaded Ethiopia in the same year. The CPUSA criticized the invasion as part of the colonial enterprise.

Haywood and similar members tried to promote the Black Belt national question in the 1950s, without success. Communists did not officially support this concept again until the New Communist Movement of the 1970s and 1980s. After being expelled by the CPUSA, Haywood joined the October League (OL), which eventually became the Communist Party (Marxist–Leninist) in the United States. Both the OL and the CP (ML) adopted the old CPUSA line calling for self-determination for residents of the Black Belt. Other New Communist Movement groups, like the Communist League and the Revolutionary Workers Headquarters, also took up the Black Belt line.

In the 21st century
In the 21st century, several communist organizations have continued to uphold the Black Belt national question. Chief among them is the Freedom Road Socialist Organization (FRSO), which continues to organize around the line. The FRSO publishes several pamphlets and statements on the African-American national question in the Black Belt. They uphold the right of national self-determination by the region.

The Malcolm X Grassroots Movement is another revolutionary organization upholding the right of self-determination for residents of the Black Belt.

See also
 Legal status of Hawaii
 Hawaiian sovereignty movement
 United States federal recognition of Native Hawaiians
 Aboriginal self-government in Canada
 Ethnic separatism
 Ethnic nationalism
 Indigenous rights
 Self-determination
 Self-determination of Australian Aborigines
 Native American self-determination
 Tribal sovereignty
 National questions
 Racial oppression

References

African and Black nationalism in the United States
Independence movements